Roox is a village in the north-central Mudug region of Somalia. Situated in the Galdogob District just to the west-northwest of Bacadweyn, it is located about 40 km northeast of the city of Galdogob. The area is mainly occupied in small-scale farming.

References

External links
GeoNames
 Maps of the Galdogob district with the location of Roox:  here and here.

Populated places in Mudug